Phaeobotryon cupressi is an endophytic fungus first found on Cupressus sempervirens in Iran.

References

Further reading
Soltani, Jalal, and Mahdieh S. Hosseyni Moghaddam. "Antiproliferative, antifungal, and antibacterial activities of endophytic alternaria species from Cupressaceae." Current Microbiology 69.3 (2014): 349–356.
Hosseyni-Moghaddam, Mahdieh S., and Jalal Soltani. "Bioactivity of endophytic Trichoderma fungal species from the plant family Cupressaceae."Annals of Microbiology 64.2 (2014): 753–761.

External links 
MycoBank

Botryosphaeriales